The 1943 Michigan State Normal Hurons football team was an American football team that represented Michigan State Normal College (later renamed Eastern Michigan University) as an independent during the 1943 college football season. In their 22nd season under head coach Elton Rynearson, the Hurons compiled an undefeated record of 2–0, playing two games (on October 18 and 28) against Wayne State and winning both games by identical 14–0 scores. William R. Nuse and John G. Baker were the team captains. The team played its home game at Briggs Field on the school's campus in Ypsilanti, Michigan.

Schedule

References

Michigan State Normal
Eastern Michigan Eagles football seasons
College football undefeated seasons
Michigan State Normal Hurons football